Yonathan Kapitolnik (born 25 November 2002) is an Israeli athlete who specializes in the high jump. He was the gold medallist at the World Athletics U20 Championships in 2021.

References

External links
 
 

2002 births
Living people
Israeli male high jumpers
World Athletics U20 Championships winners
21st-century Israeli people